is a volleyball player from Japan, who plays as a libero for the Men's National Team. He was named Best Digger at the 2008 Olympic Qualification Tournament, where Japan ended up in second place and qualified for the 2008 Summer Olympics in Beijing, PR China.

Honours
2002 World Championship — 9th place
2003 FIVB World Cup — 9th place
2004 Olympic Qualification Tournament — 6th place (did not qualify)
2006 World Championship — 8th place
2007 FIVB World Cup — 9th place
2008 Olympic Qualification Tournament — 2nd place (qualified)

References
 FIVB biography

1975 births
Living people
Japanese men's volleyball players
Place of birth missing (living people)
Olympic volleyball players of Japan
Volleyball players at the 2008 Summer Olympics
Volleyball players at the 2006 Asian Games
Asian Games competitors for Japan